MEDLINE (Medical Literature Analysis and Retrieval System Online, or MEDLARS Online) is a bibliographic database of life sciences and biomedical information. It includes bibliographic information for articles from academic journals covering medicine, nursing, pharmacy, dentistry, veterinary medicine, and health care. MEDLINE also covers much of the literature in biology and biochemistry, as well as fields such as molecular evolution.

Compiled by the United States National Library of Medicine (NLM), MEDLINE is freely available on the Internet and searchable via PubMed and NLM's National Center for Biotechnology Information's Entrez system.

History 
MEDLARS (Medical Literature Analysis and Retrieval System) is a computerised biomedical bibliographic retrieval system. It was launched by the National Library of Medicine in 1964 and was the first large scale, computer based, retrospective search service available to the general public.

Initial development of MEDLARS 

Since 1879, the National Library of Medicine had published Index Medicus, a monthly guide to medical articles in thousands of journals. The huge volume of bibliographic citations was manually compiled. In 1957 the staff of the NLM started to plan the mechanization of the Index Medicus, prompted by a desire for a better way to manipulate all this information, not only for Index Medicus but also to produce subsidiary products. By 1960 a detailed specification was prepared and by the spring of 1961 a request for proposals was sent out to 72 companies to develop the system. As a result, a contract was awarded to the General Electric Company. A Minneapolis-Honeywell 800 computer, which was to run MEDLARS, was delivered to the NLM in March 1963, and Frank Bradway Rogers (Director of the NLM 1949 to 1963) said at the time "..If all goes well, the January 1964 issue of Index Medicus will be ready to emerge from the system at the end of this year. It may be that this will mark the beginning of a new era in medical bibliography."

MEDLARS cost $3 million to develop and at the time of its completion in 1964, no other publicly available, fully operational electronic storage and retrieval system of its magnitude existed. The original computer configuration operated from 1964 until its replacement by MEDLARS II in January 1975.

MEDLARS Online 
In late 1971, an online version called MEDLINE ("MEDLARS Online") became available as a way to do online searching of MEDLARS from remote medical libraries. This early system covered 239 journals and boasted that it could support as many as 25 simultaneous online users (remotely logged-in from distant medical libraries) at one time. However, this system remained primarily in the hands of libraries, with researchers able to submit pre-programmed search tasks to librarians and obtain results on printouts, but rarely able to interact with the NLM computer output in real-time. This situation continued through the beginning of the 1990s and the rise of the World Wide Web.

In 1996, soon after most home computers began automatically bundling efficient web browsers, a free public version of MEDLINE was deployed. This system, called PubMed, was offered to the general online user in June, 1997, when MEDLINE searches via the Web were demonstrated.

Database 
In May 2022, the database contained more than 34 million records from 5,639 selected publications covering biomedicine and health from 1781 to the present. Originally, the database covered articles starting from 1965, but this has been enhanced, and records as far back as 1781 are now available within the main index. The database is freely accessible on the Internet via the PubMed interface and new citations are added Tuesday through Saturday. For citations added during 1995-2003: about 48% are for cited articles published in the U.S., about 88% are published in English, and about 76% have English abstracts written by authors of the articles. The most common topic in the database is Cancer with around 12% of all records between 1950-2016, which have risen from 6% in 1950 to 16% in 2016.

Retrieval 
MEDLINE uses Medical Subject Headings (MeSH) for information retrieval. Engines designed to search MEDLINE (such as Entrez and PubMed) generally use a Boolean expression combining MeSH terms, words in abstract and title of the article, author names, date of publication, etc. Entrez and PubMed can also find articles similar to a given one based on a mathematical scoring system that takes into account the similarity of word content of the abstracts and titles of two articles.

MEDLINE added a "publication type" term for “randomized controlled trial” in 1991 and a MESH subset “systematic review” in 2001.

Importance 
MEDLINE functions as an important resource for biomedical researchers and journal clubs from all over the world. Along with the Cochrane Library and a number of other databases, MEDLINE facilitates evidence-based medicine. Most systematic review articles published presently build on extensive searches of MEDLINE to identify articles that might be useful in the review. MEDLINE influences researchers in their choice of journals in which to publish.

Inclusion of journals 
More than 5,200 biomedical journals are indexed in MEDLINE. New journals are not included automatically or immediately. Several criteria for selection are applied. Selection is based on the recommendations of a panel, the Literature Selection Technical Review Committee, based on scientific scope and quality of a journal. The Journals Database (one of the Entrez databases) contains information, such as its name abbreviation and publisher, about all journals included in Entrez, including PubMed. Journals that no longer meet the criteria are removed. Being indexed in MEDLINE gives a non-predatory identity to a journal.

Usage 
PubMed usage has been on the rise since 2008. In 2011, PubMed/MEDLINE was searched 1.8 billion times, up from 1.6 billion searches in the previous year.

A service such as MEDLINE strives to balance usability with power and comprehensiveness. In keeping with the fact that MEDLINE's primary user community is professionals (medical scientists, health care providers), searching MEDLINE effectively is a learned skill; untrained users are sometimes frustrated with the large numbers of articles returned by simple searches. Counterintuitively, a search that returns thousands of articles is not guaranteed to be comprehensive. Unlike using a typical Internet search engine, PubMed searching of MEDLINE requires a little investment of time. Using the MeSH database to define the subject of interest is one of the most useful ways to improve the quality of a search. Using MeSH terms in conjunction with limits (such as publication date or publication type), qualifiers (such as adverse effects or prevention and control), and text-word searching is another. Finding one article on the subject and clicking on the "Related Articles" link to get a collection of similarly classified articles can expand a search that otherwise yields few results.

For lay users who are trying to learn about health and medicine topics, the NIH offers MedlinePlus; thus, although such users are still free to search and read the medical literature themselves (via PubMed), they also have some help with curating it into something comprehensible and practically applicable for patients and family members.

See also 
 Altbib
 LILACS
 HubMed  an alternative interface to the PubMed medical literature database.
 Journalology
 eTBLAST – a natural language text similarity engine for MEDLINE and other text databases.
 Medscape
 Twease – an open-source biomedical search engine

References

External links
 

Biological databases
United States National Library of Medicine
Bibliographic databases and indexes
Medical databases
Online databases
Year of establishment missing
Public domain databases